Wærness is a Norwegian surname. Notable people with the surname include:

Anne Lise Wærness (born 1951), Norwegian high jumper
Gunnar Wærness (born 1971), Norwegian poet
Kari Wærness
Petter Wærness (born 1947), Norwegian rower

Norwegian-language surnames